College Avenue Secondary School is one of three public high schools in Woodstock, Ontario under the Thames Valley District School Board and is named after the street on which it is located.  It is built on the site of the former Woodstock College, which closed in 1926. It offers full courses for students in grade 9 through 12. The school has a visual arts program and a number of technology courses, most notably its recently introduced Hospitality program. The technological programs include; baking, cooking, horticulture, auto mechanics, welding and woodshop. The school also has a football team, as well as basketball, ice hockey, rugby, swimming, track and volleyball teams called the CASS Knights. They offer a large variety of clubs, most notably the Band as well as Magic Club.

Actress Andrea Roth, comedian Greg Morton, and rapper Owen Vermeersch attended this institution.

See also
List of high schools in Ontario

High schools in Oxford County, Ontario
Woodstock, Ontario
Educational institutions in Canada with year of establishment missing